Harland William Whitmore (October 14, 1939 - August 15, 2022) was an American emeritus professor of economics, formerly at the University of Cincinnati. He published several books related to the economy and the world. He also consulted and worked with the United States Environmental Protection Agency on the integration of the macroeconomy with ecological systems. Harland earned a bachelor's in mathematics from Lawrence University, a master of business administration, and a PhD in economics from Michigan State University.

Harland is the son of Harland William Whitmore Sr. who holds multiple patents in refrigeration assembly.

Books
The world economy, population growth, and the global ecosystem : a unified theoretical model of interdependent dynamic systems New York, NY : Palgrave Macmillan, 2007.  
World economy macroeconomics Armonk, N.Y. : M.E. Sharpe, ©1997. In 962 libraries according to WorldCat
Global environmental macroeconomics  Armonk, N.Y. : M.E. Sharpe, ©1999. In 240 libraries according to WorldCat
Aggregate Economic Choice. Berlin: Springer-Verlag, 1986.

References
 
https://business.uc.edu/faculty-and-research/departments/economics/faculty/harland-whitemore.html
Whitmore, H. W. (1955). U.S. Patent No. 2,715,976. Washington, DC: U.S. Patent and Trademark Office.
Whitmore, H. W. (1951). U.S. Patent No. 2,547,550. Washington, DC: U.S. Patent and Trademark Office.
Whitmore, H. W. (1964). U.S. Patent No. 3,116,610. Washington, DC: U.S. Patent and Trademark Office.

Living people
University of Cincinnati faculty
21st-century American economists
1939 births